A half-mask is a mask that covers half the face. It may mean:

a mask covering from below the eyes to below the chin
a dust mask
a filtering facepiece respirator
an elastomeric respirator

a mask covering the eyes and perhaps the forehead and/or nose, but not the mouth.
a half-face diving mask